West End Hills Missionary Baptist Church is a historic church at 1680 19th Place SW in Birmingham, Alabama. It was built between 1959 and 1965 when the main sanctuary was dedicated. The church is significant for its congregation's participation in the Alabama Christian Movement for Human Rights rallies for Civil rights in the 1950s and the 1960s under the direction of its pastor, the Rev. Coleman M. Smith. It was added to the National Register of Historic Places in 2005.

References

National Register of Historic Places in Birmingham, Alabama
Colonial Revival architecture in Alabama
Churches completed in 1959
Churches in Birmingham, Alabama
Churches on the National Register of Historic Places in Alabama